Red Hot Tires is a 1925 American silent comedy film produced and released by Warner Brothers. The film was based on a story written by Darryl Zanuck, under the pseudonym Gregory Rogers, and directed by Erle C. Kenton. The film stars Monte Blue and Patsy Ruth Miller.

Ten years later,  Warner Bros. released 1935 film with the same title, which unrelated to the 1925 version.

Plot
As described in a review in a film magazine, Al Jones (Blue) sees a Elizabeth Lowden (Miller) and becomes so infatuated with her that he runs his car into a steam roller. As he expresses it afterwards, every time he sees her something happens. Her father (Esmelton) is chief of police and, to cure her of speeding, he puts her in jail. Jones demands the same treatment and is accommodated, but gets out first and strives to get back in only to find that the young woman has been released. He then has a hard time getting out. Crooks kidnap Elizabeth and Jones, overcoming his fear of automobiles since his first accident, gives chase, fights all over the house in which they take refuge, and finally licks the crooks and wins the affections of Elizabeth.

Cast

Preservation
A copy of Red Hot Tires is preserved in the Library of Congress collection.

References

External links

1925 films
American silent feature films
Films based on short fiction
Films directed by Erle C. Kenton
Warner Bros. films
1926 comedy films
1926 films
Silent American comedy films
American black-and-white films
1925 comedy films
Films about automobiles
1920s American films